SPO4 Santiago: Sharpshooter is a 1996 Filipino biographical action film directed by Pepe Marcos. The film stars Ramon "Bong" Revilla Jr. in the title role. The film is based on the life of Jaime Santiago, a former police officer who is currently a presiding judge of the Regional Trial Court in Manila.

Cast

Ramon "Bong" Revilla Jr. as SPO4 Jaime Santiago
Ina Raymundo as Elsa Lopez
Tonton Gutierrez as Boy Palomar
Raymond Bagatsing as Boy's Henchman
Jun Hidalgo as Boy's Henchman
Richard Bonnin as Boy's Henchman
Junar Aristorenas as Boy's Henchman
Robert Miller as Boy's Henchman
Dindi Gallardo as Jaime's Wife
Olive Madridejos as Jaime's Sister
Caridad Sanchez as Jaime's Mother
Stefano Mori as Jaime's Son
Lito Legaspi as Col. Dibayan
Johnny Vicar as Col. Noblesa
Tony Tacorda as Capt. Cruz
Danny Labra as Mr. Lim
July Hidalgo as SPO2 Hidalgo
Atoy Co Santiago's Group
Danny Riel as Santiago's Group
Boy Roque as Boy Domingo
Zandro Zamora as Fake Doctor
Telly Babasa as Hostage Fastfood

Release
The film premiered on May 1, 1996, at the Odeon Theater in Sta. Cruz, Manila. Jaime Santiago himself attended the premiere with actor Bong Revilla, but had to leave early when he heard of a hostage situation taking place in Tondo. After negotiations by the SWAT team on location proved unsuccessful, Santiago positioned himself in a nearby house and shot the hostage taker dead with an M16 rifle, saving the hostage who was a one-year-old girl.

References

External links

1996 films
1990s action films
Biographical action films
Filipino-language films
Films directed by Pepe Marcos
Philippine action films
Philippine biographical films
Moviestars Production films
Viva Films films